Cory Spinks (born Cory Calvin; February 20, 1978) is an American former professional boxer who competed from 1997 to 2013. He held multiple world championships in two weight classes, including the undisputed welterweight title from 2003 to 2005, and the IBF junior middleweight title twice between 2006 and 2010. Additionally, he challenged once for the lineal middleweight title in 2007.

Early life and amateur career
Spinks is the son of former world heavyweight champion Leon Spinks and nephew of former world heavyweight and light heavyweight champion Michael Spinks. He has an amateur record of 78–3, and won the National Golden Gloves and National Police Athletic League welterweight titles in 1997.

Professional career

Undisputed welterweight champion
Spinks went 29–2 in his first 31 contests, only losing to Antonio Díaz (regarded as a controversial decision by some boxing analysts and ringside observers) and Michele Piccirillo, whom he defeated by decision in a re-match.

However, Spinks rose to boxing stardom by unifying the WBC, WBA, IBF, and The Ring and lineal welterweight titles on December 13, 2003, when he defeated Ricardo Mayorga by majority decision. Spinks was a 5 to 1 underdog going into the fight with Mayorga. The judges scored the fight 114–112, 117–109, 114-114, favoring Spinks.

Spinks vs. Judah I, II
Spink's first Welterweight title defense came on April 10, 2004, against former world champion Zab Judah.  Spinks controlled the action over the first four rounds. In the later rounds, however, Judah's quick left hands began to find their target. Both men hit the deck late, but all three scorecards favored Spinks, as the champion won with scores of 116–111, 114–112, 114–112.

Spink's second Welterweight defence came when the two fighters met in a February 2005 rematch.  The second fight was the first major bout in St. Louis in more than 40 years, and it was a 22,000+ sellout at the Savvis Center in St. Louis, Missouri. Spinks received star treatment during introductions, with rapper Nelly accompanying him into the ring and leading the crowd in a singalong.

Midway through round 9, Judah landed a huge left that hurt Spinks, with a follow-up putting him on the canvas. Spinks rose, but Judah rushed in with a series of hard punches that left Spinks defenseless on the ropes.  Judah tried to get the official to step in, but the bout continued until another right-left sent Spinks sprawling into the ropes, where the official finally halted the bout with 11 seconds left, transferring the undisputed Welterweight Championship to Judah.

IBF junior middleweight champion
On July 8, 2006, Spinks earned his fifth world title, the IBF Junior Middleweight Championship (also called Super Welterweight by some sanctioning bodies), in a fight with reigning champion Roman Karmazin at the Savvis Center. Despite having some rough moments in the bout, Spinks beat Karmazin by majority decision with final scorecards of 114-114, 115–113, and 115–113.

Unified middleweight title challenge
On May 19, 2007, Spinks moved up one weight class to Middleweight with a challenge against World Middleweight Champion Jermain Taylor at the FedEx Forum in Memphis.  Taylor held on to the title, defeating Spinks in a split decision.

Losing and regaining the IBF title
On March 27, 2008, in a fight with Verno Phillips at the Scottrade Center in St. Louis, Spinks lost the IBF Junior Middleweight Championship via controversial split decision.

On April 24, 2009, Spinks reclaimed the vacant IBF Junior Middleweight Championship in a close split-decision victory over fellow St. Louis native Deandre Latimore.  Spinks fought back after suffering a 1st round knockdown to win by the scores of 115-112 Spinks, 115-112 Latimore and 114-113 Spinks. The fight was held at the Scottrade Center in St. Louis.

On August 7, 2010, after a five-month delay due to scheduling conflicts, Spinks lost the IBF Junior Middleweight Championship in a fight with mandatory challenger Cornelius Bundrage at the Scottrade Center in St. Louis.  The fight was decided by a technical knockout in the fifth round.

On January 28, 2012, Spinks defeated Sechew Powell by unanimous decision to become the #1 and mandatory contender for Bundrage's IBF Junior Middleweight Title, his second consecutive victory since coming back from the loss to Bundrage. The fight took place at The Shrine Mosque in Springfield, Missouri.

Professional boxing record

See also
List of undisputed boxing champions
List of welterweight boxing champions
List of light middleweight boxing champions
List of WBA world champions
List of WBC world champions
List of IBF world champions
List of The Ring world champions
List of notable boxing families

References

External links

Cory Spinks profile at About.com
Cory Spinks profile at Cyber Boxing Zone

1978 births
Boxers from St. Louis
Living people
International Boxing Federation champions
American male boxers
World welterweight boxing champions
World light-middleweight boxing champions
World Boxing Council champions
World Boxing Association champions
The Ring (magazine) champions
National Golden Gloves champions
Middleweight boxers